Fred Molyneux (25 July 1944 – 1 October 2019) was an English professional footballer who played as a central defender in the Football League for Southport, Plymouth Argyle, Exeter City and Tranmere Rovers. He also spent two seasons with Wigan Athletic in the Northern Premier League, making 74 appearances.

References

1944 births
2019 deaths
People from Wallasey
English footballers
Association football central defenders
English Football League players
Southport F.C. players
Plymouth Argyle F.C. players
Exeter City F.C. players
Tranmere Rovers F.C. players
Wigan Athletic F.C. players
Footballers from Merseyside